Omer Nixon Custer (December 25, 1873 – October 17, 1942) was an American politician, newspaper editor, and businessman.

Life

Born in Fayette County, Pennsylvania, Custer moved to Galesburg, Illinois where he owned the Galesburg Register-Mail newspaper. He was also president of the Galesburg National Bank and of the telephone company. Custer was a Republican. He served as Illinois Treasurer from 1925 to 1927 and 1929 to 1931. As time went on Omer Custer expanded his business enterprises in many fields of endeavor. The 1930–31 edition of "Who's Who in America" included Custer, listed as the president of the First Galesburg National Bank, Purington Paving Brick Company, Western Illinois Ice Company, Hotel Custer Company; publisher of the Galesburg Register-Mail; and director of the Intra State Telephone Company, Illinois Light and Power Company, Galesburg Overall Company, Beatrice Creamery Company, and Western Investment Company. He was a member of the Masons, Elks, Rotary, Hamilton Club and Chicago Rod and Gun Club. He was also a trustee of Lombard College.

Death
Custer died in Galesburg, Illinois of a heart attack on October 17, 1942. His estate was valued at $1,169,704.

Notes

1873 births
1942 deaths
People from Fayette County, Pennsylvania
People from Galesburg, Illinois
Businesspeople from Illinois
Editors of Illinois newspapers
Illinois Republicans
State treasurers of Illinois
Journalists from Pennsylvania
Journalists from Illinois